Craig Clemons (born June 1, 1949 in Sidney, Ohio) is a former American football safety in the National Football League. He was drafted by the Chicago Bears 12th overall in the 1972 NFL Draft. He played college football at Iowa. After the 1971 college football season Clemons earned First-team All-American and First-team All-Big Ten honors.

References 

1948 births
Living people
American football safeties
Iowa Hawkeyes football players
Chicago Bears players
People from Sidney, Ohio